Sleeping Beauty is a 1955 West German family film directed by Fritz Genschow and starring Angela von Leitner, Gert Reinholm and Karin Hardt.

Cast
 Angela von Leitner as Sleeping Beauty
 Gert Reinholm as Prince Charming
 Karin Hardt as The Queen
 Fritz Genschow as The King
 Ursula Becker
 Gustav Bertram
 Walter Bluhm
 Ingrid Cramer
 Klaus Gotthardt
 Waltraud Habicht
 Christiane Hase
 Erika Hermann
 Hannelore Herrndorf
 Irmgard Lehmann
 Ilse Maass
 Anni Marle
 Rudolf W. Marnitz
 Wulf Rittscher
 Sylvia Röber
 Gisela Schauroth
 Elfe Schneider
 Erika Stark
 Renée Stobrawa
 Rudi Stöhr
 Pia Trajun
 Paul Tripp as Narrator
 Theodor Vogeler
 Friedhelm von Schweinitz
 Wolfgang Zill

References

Bibliography 
 Jack Zipes. The Enchanted Screen: The Unknown History of Fairy-Tale Films. Routledge, 2011.

External links 
 

1955 films
West German films
1950s German-language films
Films directed by Fritz Genschow
Films based on Sleeping Beauty
German children's films
1950s German films